Shoal Township is an inactive township in Clinton County, in the U.S. state of Missouri.

Shoal Township took its name from Shoal Creek.

References

Townships in Missouri
Townships in Clinton County, Missouri